Jacqueline M. Newman is a professor emeritus at Queens College-CUNY, specializing in Chinese cuisine, history, gastronomy, and food culture. Considered a trailblazer in the field, Newman has authored numerous books on the subject of Chinese cuisine and is the editor-in-chief of the Flavor and Fortune, a periodical focusing on the science and art of Chinese cuisine. She has also served on the awards committee of James Beard Foundation and on Board of Directors of the Food Exhibition Museum in Suzhou, China.

Academics
Newman originally earned degrees for elementary school teaching from kindergarten to grade 8, however her academic career began by teaching Chinese cooking in the Home-Economics Department at Queens College-CUNY. This involvement in Chinese cuisines in the department led her to continue earn her Masters and 
Doctorate in home economics.

The subject of her doctoral thesis originated with a discussion with New York University Professor Ruth Linke, and involved comparing the dietary habits of culturally Chinese people in China and versus the United States. Since then, Chinese and Asian cuisines and food habits has been the focus of her academic research.

In 2002, Newman gifted to Stony Brook University a historically significant collection of over 4000 pieces of audio and visual material on Chinese food culture, medicine, and history and Chinese cookbooks. Known as the Jacqueline M. Newman Chinese Cookbook Collection, it "...provides a valuable record of the Chinese Diaspora that has carried its rich cuisine to every corner of the globe." In 2013, Newman is looking to hand over her position as the editor-in-chef for Flavor and Fortune.

Newman is also the single largest contributor and donor to the Harley Spiller Menus Collection at the University of Toronto, Scarborough, which is the world's largest collection of Chinese restaurant menus.

Contributions 
Her books include:

 Chinese Cookbooks: An Annotated English-Language Compendium (1987)
 Cooking from China's Fujian Province and Food Culture in China (2004).

She also contributed a text on Chinese cuisine to The Oxford Encyclopedia of Food and Drink in America.

Awards
For her key role in the Western study of Chinese cuisine, Jacqueline M. Newman has garnered several accolades: 
2009 Amelia Award 
2010 Most Influential Personalities in American Chinese Restaurant Industry

References

External links
2009 Amelia Award speech
 Confucius Was A Foodie segment by Christine Cushing interviewing Newman
 Flavor & Fortune website

1932 births
Living people
American women academics
American editors
New York University alumni
Queens College, City University of New York faculty
Food historians
21st-century American women
American food writers
American cookbook writers
Women food writers
Women cookbook writers